Ethel Larcombe may refer to: 
 Ethel Thomson Larcombe (18791965) British tennis player 
 Ethel Larcombe (artist) (18761940) British children's book illustrator and designer